Shalehsiv (also Romanized as Shalehsīv; also known as Shalehsīt) is a village in Baryaji Rural District, in the Central District of Sardasht County, West Azerbaijan Province, Iran. At the 2006 census, its population was 16, in 5 families.

References 

Populated places in Sardasht County